Male Orjule is an uninhabited Croatian island in the Adriatic Sea located southeast of Lošinj.

References

Islands of the Adriatic Sea
Islands of Croatia
Uninhabited islands of Croatia
Landforms of Primorje-Gorski Kotar County